Gamma Pyxidis, Latinized from γ Pyxidis, is a single, orange-hued star in the southern constellation Pyxis. It is visible to the naked eye, having an apparent visual magnitude of 4.010. Based upon an annual parallax shift of 15.73 mas as seen from Earth, it is located about 207 light years from the Sun. The star is moving further from the Sun with a radial velocity of +24.5 km/s.

Properties
This is an evolved K-type giant star with a stellar classification of K3 III. It is a red clump star on the horizontal branch, indicating that it is generating energy through helium fusion at its core. The composition of the stellar atmosphere is similar to the Sun, having roughly the same abundance of iron in its spectrum. The star has an estimated 1.64 times the mass of the Sun and has expanded to nearly 22 times the Sun's radius. At the age of around four billion years, it is radiating 178 times the Sun's luminosity from its enlarged photosphere at an effective temperature of 4,270 K.

Gamma Pyxidis is moving through the Galaxy at a speed of 54.2 km/s relative to the Sun. Its projected Galactic orbit carries it between 21,300 and 30,700 light years from the center of the Galaxy.

Naming

References

K-type giants
Horizontal-branch stars
Pyxidis, Gamma
Pyxis (constellation)
Durchmusterung objects
075691
043409
3518